Fenerbahçe Women's Basketball, commonly known as Fenerbahçe, currently also known as Fenerbahçe Alagöz Holding for sponsorship reasons, are the women's basketball department of Fenerbahçe SK, a major Turkish multi-sport club based in Istanbul, Turkey.

Founded in 1954, they became the most successful club in domestic competitions, having won 43 national trophies, and achieved considerable success in European competitions. They became EuroLeague runners-up on three occasions, in the 2012–13, 2013–14, and 2016–17 seasons and reached the third place twice in 2016 and 2021. They also became fourth in the 2011–12 and 2014–15 seasons. Furthermore, Fenerbahçe became runners-up in the EuroCup in 2005. Overall, they played in five major European finals and managed to be among the best four European clubs eight times. 

Domestically, Fenerbahçe won a record 19 Turkish championship titles (3 in the former Turkish Women's Basketball Championship and 16 in the Turkish Women's League), a record 13 Turkish Cups, and a record 12 Turkish Super Cups, among others. The team play their matches at the club's own 2,500-seat Metro Enerji Sports Hall.

Previous names
 Fenerbahçe
 Fenerbahçe Öznur Kablo (2019-2021)
 Fenerbahçe Safiport (2021-present)

Players

Current roster
{| class="toccolours" style="font-size: 88%; width: 69%; "
! colspan="2" style="background-color: #163962; color:#FFED00; text-align: center;" | Fenerbahçe roster
|- style="background-color:#FFED00 ;color: #163962; text-align: center;"
! Players !! Coaches
|-
| valign="top" | 
{| class="sortable" style="background:transparent; margin:0px; width:100%;"
!  !!  !!   !! Name !! Height !! Weight !! Age – Date of birth
|-

Depth chart

Honours

European competitions
 EuroLeague Women
 Runners-up (4): 2012–13, 2013–14, 2016–17, 2021–22
 Third place (2): 2015–16, 2020–21
 Fourth place (2): 2011–12, 2014–15
 EuroCup Women
 Runners-up (1): 2004–05
 Fourth place (1): 2003–04
 Southern Conference FIBA Europa
 Winners  (1): 2004–05

Domestic competitions
 Turkish Super League
 Winners (16) (record): 1998–99, 2001–02, 2003–04, 2005–06, 2006–07, 2007–08, 2008–09, 2009–10, 2010–11, 2011–12, 2012–13, 2015–16, 2017–18, 2018–19, 2020–21, 2021–2022
 Runners-up (9): 1990–91, 1991–92, 1994–95, 1995–96, 1999–00, 2000–01, 2004–05, 2013–14, 2016–17

 Turkish Cup
 Winners (13) (record): 1998–99, 1999–00, 2000–01, 2003–04, 2004–05, 2005–06, 2006–07, 2007–08, 2008–09, 2014–15, 2015–16, 2019, 2020
 Runners-up (6): 1994–95, 2009–10, 2011–12, 2012–13, 2013–14, 2021–22
 Turkish Super Cup
 Winners (12) (record): 1999, 2000, 2001, 2004, 2005, 2007, 2010, 2012, 2013, 2014, 2015, 2019
 Runners-up (8): 1995, 2002, 2006, 2008, 2009, 2011, 2016, 2017, 2018

 Turkish Women's Basketball Championships (defunct)
 Winners (3): 1956, 1957, 1958
 Runners-up (1): 1959

Team captains

This is a list of the senior team's captains in the recent years.

Head coaches

Notable players

Domestic Players
 Birsel Vardarlı (12 seasons: '07-'19)
 Gülşah Akkaya (2 seasons: '95-'96, '99-'00)
 Şükran Albayrak (6 seasons: '00-'06)
 Melike Bakırcıoğlu (5 seasons: '05-'10)
 Ayşe Cora (4 seasons: '16-'20)
 Olcay Çakır (8 seasons: '10-'16, '19-'21)
 Begüm Dalgalar (6 seasons: '05-'11)
 Devran Tanaçan (5 seasons: '02-'04, '09-'12)
 Selin Ekiz (3 seasons: '06-'09)
  Korel Engin (1 season: '05-'06)
 Burcu Erbaş (3 seasons: '06-'09)
 Duygu Fırat (3 seasons: '06-'09)
  Barbara Turner (1 season: '06-'07)
 Ecem Güler (2 seasons: '10-'12)
 Yasemin Horasan (1 season: '12-'13)
 Şaziye İvegin (4 seasons: '04-'07, '10-'11)
 Özge Kavurmacıoğlu (2 seasons: '10-'12)
 Sariye Kumral (3 seasons: '00-'03)
 Tuğçe Murat (3 seasons: '06-'09)
  Nevin Nevlin (5 seasons: '08-'13)
 Arzu Özyiğit (7 seasons: '98-'05)
 Nalan Ramazanoğlu (11 seasons: '98-'09)
 Kübra Siyahdemir (3 seasons: '11-'14)
 Esra Şencebe (4 seasons: '03-'06, '12-'13)
 Esmeral Tunçluer (9 seasons: '00-'02, '07-'14)
 Tuğçe Canıtez (8 seasons: '13-'21)
  Quanitra Hollingsworth (2 seasons: '13-'15)
 Nevriye Yılmaz (7 seasons: '05-'12)
 Nilay Yiğit (3 seasons: '04-'07)
 Serap Yücesir (7 seasons: '98-'03, '04-'06)
 Müjde Yüksel (2 seasons: '03-'05)
 Tilbe Şenyürek (2 seasons: '17-'19)
 Pelin Bilgiç (2 seasons: '16-'18)
 Sevgi Uzun (2 seasons: '19-'21)
 Esra Ural Topuz (4 seasons: '16-'20)
 Melis Gülcan (2 seasons: '15-'17)

European Players
  Sviatlana Volnaya (1 season: '07-'08)
  Anastasiya Verameyenka (6 seasons: '12-'14,'15-'19)
   Gergena Baranzova (3 seasons: '02-'03, '07-'09)
  Korana Longin-Zanze (2 seasons: '04-'06)
   Shavonte Zellous  (1 season: '15)
  Hana Horáková (1 season: '10-'11)
  Michaela Pavlíčková (1 season: '02-'03)
   Kia Vaughn (3 seasons: '17-'19, '20-'21)
  Andrea Congreaves (1 season: '98-'99)
   Émilie Gomis (1 season: '08-'09)
  Isabelle Yacoubou (1 season: '13-'14)
  Sandrine Gruda (1 season: '16-'17)
   Bria Hartley (1 season: '18-'19)
  Linda Fröhlich (1 season: '06-'07)
   Allie Quigley (2 seasons: '15-'17)
  Andrea Nagy (1 season: '98-'99)
  Anna Vajda (1 season: '10-'11)
  Cecilia Zandalasini (3 seasons: '18-'21)
  Giorgia Sottana (2 seasons: '17-'19)
  Elīna Babkina (1 season: '11-'12)
  Anete Jēkabsone-Žogota (1 season: '10-'11)
  Ieva Kubliņa (1 season: '12-'13)
  Zane Tamane (1 season: '11-'12)
  Kamilė Nacickaitė (1 season: '15-'16)
  Agnieszka Bibrzycka (3 seasons: '12-'15)
  Ewelina Kobryn (1 season: '15-'16)
  Elena Baranova (1 season: '99-'00)
  Oksana Zakalyuzhnaya (2 seasons: '00-'02)
  Ivona Jerković (1 season: '04-'05)
  Ivana Matović (4 seasons: '10-'14)
  Miljana Bojović (1 season: '14-'15)
  Ana Dabović (1 season: '17-'18)
   Astou Ndour (1 season: '14-'15)
  Laura Nicholls (2 seasons: '19-'21)
  Anna Cruz (1 season: '19-'20)

Non-European Players
  Penny Taylor (3 seasons: '09-'12)
  Tammy Sutton-Brown (5 seasons: '06-'11)
  Matee Ajavon (2 seasons: '08-'10)
  Tina Charles (1 season: '14-'15)
  Marissa Coleman (1 season: '15-'16)
  Clarissa Davis (2 seasons: '97-'99)
  Bethany Donaphin (1 season: '03-'04)
  Tonya Edwards (1 season: '99-'00)
  Summer Erb (1 season: '03-'04)
  Marie Ferdinand-Harris (1 season: '04-'05)
  Andrea Gardner (1 season: '05-'06)
  Bridgette Gordon (1 season: '99-'00)
  Ebony Hoffman (2 seasons: '07-'08, '09-'10)
  Shannon Johnson (1 season: '99-'00)
  Jantel Lavender (2 seasons: '15-'17)
  Angel McCoughtry (4 seasons: '10-'14)
  Danielle McCulley (1 season: '01-'02)
  Coco Miller (2 seasons: '02-'04)
  Kelly Miller (2 seasons: '02-'04)
  Candace Parker (1 season: '16-'17)
  Cappie Pondexter (5 seasons: '06-'08,'11-'14)
  Nicole Powell (3 seasons: '05-'06, '08-'10)
  Katie Smith (1 season: '08-'09)
  Shekinna Stricklen (1 season: '16-'17)
  Diana Taurasi (1 season: '10-'11)
  Tan White (1 season: '05-'06)
  Elizabeth Williams (1 season: '19-'20)
  Aerial Powers (1 season: '17-'18)
  Kelsey Plum (2 seasons: '17-'19)
  Chelsea Gray (1 season: '19-'20)

Italic written players still play for the club.

Sponsorship and kit manufacturers

1 Main sponsorship
2 Back sponsorship
3 Short sponsorship

See also
 Fenerbahçe SK
 Fenerbahçe Basketball

References

External links
  
 Fenerbahçe at TBF.org 
 Fenerbahçe at FIBA

Fenerbahçe Basketball
Women's basketball teams in Turkey
EuroLeague Women clubs
1954 establishments in Turkey
Basketball teams established in 1954